The fourth season of the animated television series Teen Titans, based on the DC comics series of the same name by Bob Haney and Bruno Premiani, originally aired on Cartoon Network in the United States. Developed by Glen Murakami, Sam Register, and television writer David Slack. The series was produced by DC Entertainment and Warner Bros. Animation. It stars Scott Menville, Hynden Walch, Khary Payton, Tara Strong, and Greg Cipes as the main characters.

The series focuses on a team of crime-fighting teenaged superheroes, consisting of the leader Robin, foreign alien princess Starfire, green shapeshifter Beast Boy, the dark sorceress Raven, and the technological genius Cyborg. The season focuses on Raven, whose destiny to be the key to the world's destruction causes secrets about her past to unravel and the return of her father and old enemy, Trigon.

The season premiered on January 15, 2005 and ran until July 16, 2005, broadcasting 13 episodes. The season marks the first time a Teen Titans season has never aired on Kids' WB. On its sister network, it was replaced full-time by its related show The Batman (2004–08) and What's New, Scooby-Doo? (2002–06). Warner Bros. Home Video released the fourth season on DVD in the United States and Canada on November 20, 2007. Upon its release, the season received critical acclaim particularity for its main storyline and its level of maturity.

Production
Season four of Teen Titans aired on Cartoon Network from January 15 to July 16, 2005. The season was produced by DC Entertainment and Warner Bros. Animation, executive produced by Sander Schwartz and produced by Glen Murakami, Bruce Timm and Linda M. Steiner. Staff directors for the series included Michael Chang, Ben Jones and Alex Soto. The episodes for the season were written by a team of writers, which consisted of Richard Elliott, Melody Fox, Rob Hoegee, Greg Klein, Thomas Pugsley, Simon Racioppa, David Slack, and Amy Wolfram. Producer Murakami worked with Derrick Wyatt, Brianne Drouhard, and Jon Suzuki on character design while Hakjoon Kang served as the background designer for the series. The season employed a number of storyboard artists, including Eric Canete, Colin Heck, Kalvin Lee, Keo Thongkham, Scooter Tidwell, Alan Wan and Matt Youngberg.

Cast and characters

The five voice actors for the main characters - Scott Menville, Hynden Walch, Greg Cipes, Tara Strong, and Khary Payton, - reprise their roles in the fourth season as Robin, Starfire, Beast Boy, Raven, and Cyborg, respectively. Dee Bradley Baker recurs in the season, providing voices for several characters, including Space Monster in the episode "Stranded" and Plasmus in the episode "The End" Part 1. Kevin Michael Richardson returns to the series, providing the voice for Trigon, Raven's father and the season's main antagonist as well as voices for various roles, including The Bear and The Snake in the episode "The Quest" and reprises his role as Mammoth and See-More in the episode "Mother Mae-Eye". Ron Perlman reprised his role as Slade in the season.

Season four of Teen Titans featured numerous guest actors providing voices for recurring and guest characters. In the episode "Don't Touch That Dial", Alexander Polinsky reprises his role as the villain Control Freak. The episode also features the voices of Jeff Bennett the voice of Johnny Bravo
Rob Paulsen, and James Arnold Taylor for various roles. Veteran actors Takayo Fischer and Keone Young provided voices for the characters Chu-Hui the True Master, Katarou and The Monkey in the episode "The Quest". Rodger Bumpass reprised his role as the villain Dr. Light in the episode "Birthmark". The episode "Cyborg the Barbarian" features the vocal talents of Kimberly Brooks as Sarasim and Michael Clarke Duncan as both Krall and Hayden. The episode "Employee of the Month" featured Tom Kane voicing Beast Boy's boss Bob and Rob Paulsen voicing the villain The Source. In the episode "Troq", Stephen Root provides the voice of Val-Yor, an alien fighting a militia of robots while harboring hate towards Starfire and her race. The episode "The Prophecy" features Virginia Madsen voicing the character Arella. Jason Marsden played the villain Billy Numerous in the episode "Overdrive". In the episode "Mother Mae-Eye", Billie Hayes provided the voice for the villain Mother Mae-Eye while Lauren Tom provided voices for the characters Gizmo and Jinx.

Reception
The fourth season of Teen Titans performed well on Cartoon Network. The episode "The Quest" garnered a high 4.1 rating in the Kids 9-14 demographic (1.03 million viewers). The episode "The Prophecy" garnered a 2.3 Nielsen rating in the Tweens 9-14 demographic (569,000 viewers) and a 2.0 in the Kids 6-11 demographic (482,000). The episode "The End (Part 1)" garnered a 3.1 Nielsen rating in the Tweens 9-14 demographic (755,000 viewers) and 2.7 rating in the Kids 6-11 demographic (662,000 viewers). The episodes airing in July average a 2.1 Nielsen rating in the Tweens 9-14 demographic (507,000 viewers).

The season received critical acclaim. Mac McEntire of DVD Verdict awarded the fourth season a score of 87, commending the writers for creating "smarter, deeper, and emotionally rich stories", highlighting Raven's story arc, and added "The Terra storyline in Season Two showed that this series could handle bigger, more serious storylines. In Season Four, that's exactly what it delivers. For everyone who's waited for this show to grow up a little, this is the season in which that happens." John Sinnott, writing for DVD Talk, deemed the fourth season release as "Highly Recommended." Sinnott commented that "The show continues its run of strong shows in this season. There's a lot of action, a good amount of humor, and even a few touching scenes.  A fun show that's guaranteed to bring out the comic geek in everyone." Randall Cyrenne of Animated Views was mixed in his review of the season, praising the variety of stories being told but found the stories either too comedic or too intense.

Episodes

DVD release
The DVD boxset was released on November 20, 2007 in the United States and Canada. It features a series title Teen Titans: Know Your Foes, a featurette which is segmented for each of the series' main villains.

References

Teen Titans (TV series) seasons
2005 American television seasons